Dar Sarvaran (also Romanized as Dar Sarvarān; also known as Razdarān) is a village in Nargesan Rural District, Jebalbarez-e Jonubi District, Anbarabad County, Kerman Province, Iran. At the 2006 census, its population was 19, in 5 families.

References 

Populated places in Anbarabad County